Bolloré Logistics is the transport and logistics business unit of Bolloré Transport & Logistics, a fully owned subsidiary of the Bolloré Group. The company offers five types of services, including multimodal transport, customs and regulatory compliance, logistics, global supply chain, and industrial projects.

Its headquarters are in Puteaux, on the western outskirts of Paris, France. The company runs a network of 603 offices and employs 20,682 staff worldwide in 111 countries.

History

Since 1986, Bolloré Logistics was formerly established in France as a freight forwarder specialized in trade lanes from France to Africa. Today, Bolloré Logistics is the main logistics subsidiary of the Bolloré Group.

In March 2016, Bolloré Logistics and the Japanese trading, logistics, and distribution firm Toyota Tsusho (part of the Toyota conglomerate) announced they had reached a broad cooperation agreement both in Africa and globally.

In March 2019, Cyrille Bolloré, the youngest of three sons, was appointed CEO of the Bolloré Group to succeed his father Vincent Bolloré.

In December 2022, it was announced the Bolloré Logistics subsidiary, Bolloré Africa Logistics Group, had been acquired by the Geneva-headquartered international shipping line, MSC Group.

Services

The company offers seven types of core categories including: multimodal transport, trade compliance, contract logistics, global supply chain, industrial projects, e-commerce, and customer value.

Fields of logistics services cover multiple cargo 'verticals', including aerospace, aid & relief, automotive, consumer and retail, energy, fashion, food and beverage, fragrances and flavors, healthcare, manufacturing and engineering, and perfumes and cosmetics.

In July, 2020, Bolloré Logistics extended its special weekly cargo freight service between Europe and West Africa, the WARA Air Service, until 31 July.

A wide network

Africa 

 7,111 staff and 244 sites in 48 countries.

Americas 

 1,268 staff and 46 sites in 8 countries.
 In 2017, a new site of 20,000 sqm was opened in Miami, USA, to respond to the needs of the Duty Free and Travel Retail industry.

Asia-Pacific 

 5,068 staff and 120 sites in 18 countries.
 In 2019, Blue Hub was inaugurated in Singapore: a 50,000 sqm facility excelling with its equipment and leading-edge-technology.

Europe 

 6,343 staff and 156 sites in 27 countries.
 In 2021, Bolloré Logistics broadened its presence by acquiring Swedish company Global Freight Solutions (G-Solutions) and its Finnish affiliate.
 In February 2021, Bolloré Logistics acquired a majority stake in French digital freight forwarder OVRSEA to broaden its services and offer a 100% digital experience.

Middle East - South Asia 

 892 staff and 37 sites in 10 countries.
 In 2015, Bolloré Logistics opened a consolidation warehouse in Jebel Ali Free zone.

Sustainability

Bolloré Logistics has since 2018 implemented a Corporate Social Responsibility program called “Powering Sustainable Logistics”. The program aims at boosting the resolution of ethical, social and environmental issues. It involves all the employees and targets in particular eight of the United Nations’ Sustainable Development Goals. The company announced it will reduce its Scope 3 CO2 emissions by 30% by 2030 (relative to 2019) to strengthen its commitment in the fight against climate change.

On 27 April 2021, Bolloré Logistics was awarded the Platinum medal by EcoVadis, recognizing the company's structured and proactive efforts in terms of sustainable development.

Air France KLM Martinair Cargo (AFKLMP) and Bolloré Logistics joined forces to launch the first low-carbon airfreight route between Paris Charles de Gaulle and New York-JFK airports.

Innovation

In April 2019, Bolloré Logistics officially opened its first innovation center in Paris, B.Lab, a 500 sqm facility designed to complement efforts towards supply chain transformation.

Following this initiative, in November 2019, Bolloré Logistics unveiled its second B.Lab center in Singapore, boasting a 1,000 sqm facility designed to foster innovation projects.

In 2019, they launched a new Internet of Things-powered (IoT) offering that enables customers end-to-end supply chain visibility.

References

Further reading

External links
 Bolloré Group
 Bolloré Transport & Logistics (English)
 Bolloré Logistics’ Official Website (English)
 Project Logistics*

Logistics companies of France
Transport companies of France
Transport companies established in 1986
Multinational companies headquartered in France
French business families